The 1982 Asia Golf Circuit was the 21st season of golf tournaments that comprised the Asia Golf Circuit. Total prize money on the circuit passed US$1 million for the first time.

Taiwan's Hsu Sheng-san claimed the overall circuit title having won three successive tournaments during the season.

Tournament schedule
The table below shows the 1982 Asian Golf Circuit schedule. There was one change from the previous season, with South Korea founding the Maekyung Open to replace the Korea Open in order to remain part of the circuit and reschedule the national open to later in the year.

Final standings

References

Asia Golf Circuit
Asia Golf Circuit